African Americans (also referred to as Black Americans and Afro-Americans) are an ethnic group consisting of Americans with partial or total ancestry from any of the black racial groups of Africa. The term "African American" generally denotes descendants of enslaved Africans who are from the United States. 

African Americans constitute the second largest racial group in the U.S. after White Americans, as well as the third largest ethnic group after Hispanic and Latino Americans. Most African Americans are descendants of enslaved people within the boundaries of the present United States. On average, African Americans are of West/Central African with some European descent; some also have Native American and other ancestry.

According to U.S. Census Bureau data, African immigrants generally do not self-identify as African American. The overwhelming majority of African immigrants identify instead with their own respective ethnicities (~95%). Immigrants from some Caribbean and Latin American nations and their descendants may or may not also self-identify with the term.

African American history began in the 16th century, with Africans from West Africa being sold to European slave traders and transported across the Atlantic to the Thirteen Colonies. After arriving in the Americas, they were sold as slaves to European colonists and put to work on plantations, particularly in the southern colonies. A few were able to achieve freedom through manumission or escape and founded independent communities before and during the American Revolution. After the United States was founded in 1783, most Black people continued to be enslaved, being most concentrated in the American South, with four million enslaved only liberated during and at the end of the Civil War in 1865. During Reconstruction, they gained citizenship and the right to vote; due to the widespread policy and ideology of White supremacy, they were largely treated as second-class citizens and found themselves soon disenfranchised in the South. These circumstances changed due to participation in the military conflicts of the United States, substantial migration out of the South, the elimination of legal racial segregation, and the civil rights movement which sought political and social freedom. However, racism against African Americans remains a problem into the 21st century. In 2008, Barack Obama became the first African American to be elected president of the United States.

African American culture has a significant influence on worldwide culture, making numerous contributions to visual arts, literature, the English language, philosophy, politics, cuisine, sports and music. The African American contribution to popular music is so profound that virtually all American music, such as jazz, gospel, blues, disco, hip hop, R&B, soul and rock have their origins at least partially or entirely among African Americans.

History

Colonial era

The vast majority of those who were enslaved and transported in the transatlantic slave trade were people from Central and West Africa, who had been captured directly by the slave traders in coastal raids, or sold by other West Africans, or by half-European "merchant princes" to European slave traders, who brought them to the Americas.

The first African slaves arrived via Santo Domingo to the San Miguel de Gualdape colony (most likely located in the Winyah Bay area of present-day South Carolina), founded by Spanish explorer Lucas Vázquez de Ayllón in 1526. The ill-fated colony was almost immediately disrupted by a fight over leadership, during which the slaves revolted and fled the colony to seek refuge among local Native Americans. De Ayllón and many of the colonists died shortly afterward of an epidemic and the colony was abandoned. The settlers and the slaves who had not escaped returned to Haiti, whence they had come.

The marriage between Luisa de Abrego, a free Black domestic servant from Seville, and Miguel Rodríguez, a White Segovian conquistador in 1565 in St. Augustine (Spanish Florida), is the first known and recorded Christian marriage anywhere in what is now the continental United States.

The first recorded Africans in English America (including most of the future United States) were "20 and odd negroes" who came to Jamestown, Virginia via Cape Comfort in August 1619 as indentured servants. As many Virginian settlers began to die from harsh conditions, more and more Africans were brought to work as laborers.

An indentured servant (who could be White or Black) would work for several years (usually four to seven) without wages. The status of indentured servants in early Virginia and Maryland was similar to slavery. Servants could be bought, sold, or leased and they could be physically beaten for disobedience or running away. Unlike slaves, they were freed after their term of service expired or was bought out, their children did not inherit their status, and on their release from contract they received "a year's provision of corn, double apparel, tools necessary", and a small cash payment called "freedom dues". Africans could legally raise crops and cattle to purchase their freedom. They raised families, married other Africans and sometimes intermarried with Native Americans or European settlers.

By the 1640s and 1650s, several African families owned farms around Jamestown and some became wealthy by colonial standards and purchased indentured servants of their own. In 1640, the Virginia General Court recorded the earliest documentation of lifetime slavery when they sentenced John Punch, a Negro, to lifetime servitude under his master Hugh Gwyn for running away.

In the Spanish Florida some Spanish married or had unions with Pensacola, Creek or African women, both slave and free, and their descendants created a mixed-race population of mestizos and mulattos. The Spanish encouraged slaves from the colony of Georgia to come to Florida as a refuge, promising freedom in exchange for conversion to Catholicism. King Charles II issued a royal proclamation freeing all slaves who fled to Spanish Florida and accepted conversion and baptism. Most went to the area around St. Augustine, but escaped slaves also reached Pensacola. St. Augustine had mustered an all-Black militia unit defending Spanish Florida as early as 1683.

One of the Dutch African arrivals, Anthony Johnson, would later own one of the first Black "slaves", John Casor, resulting from the court ruling of a civil case.

The popular conception of a race-based slave system did not fully develop until the 18th century. The Dutch West India Company introduced slavery in 1625 with the importation of eleven Black slaves into New Amsterdam (present-day New York City). All the colony's slaves, however, were freed upon its surrender to the English.

Massachusetts was the first English colony to legally recognize slavery in 1641. In 1662, Virginia passed a law that children of enslaved women took the status of the mother, rather than that of the father, as under common law. This legal principle was called partus sequitur ventrum.

By an act of 1699, the colony ordered all free Blacks deported, virtually defining as slaves all people of African descent who remained in the colony. In 1670, the colonial assembly passed a law prohibiting free and baptized Blacks (and Indians) from purchasing Christians (in this act meaning White Europeans) but allowing them to buy people "of their owne nation".

In the Spanish Louisiana although there was no movement toward abolition of the African slave trade, Spanish rule introduced a new law called coartación, which allowed slaves to buy their freedom, and that of others. Although some did not have the money to buy their freedom, government measures on slavery allowed many free Blacks. That brought problems to the Spaniards with the French Creoles who also populated Spanish Louisiana, French creoles cited that measure as one of the system's worst elements.

First established in South Carolina in 1704, groups of armed White men—slave patrols—were formed to monitor enslaved Black people. Their function was to police slaves, especially fugitives. Slave owners feared that slaves might organize revolts or slave rebellions, so state militias were formed in order to provide a military command structure and discipline within the slave patrols so they could be used to detect, encounter, and crush any organized slave meetings which might lead to revolts or rebellions.

The earliest African American congregations and churches were organized before 1800 in both northern and southern cities following the Great Awakening. By 1775, Africans made up 20% of the population in the American colonies, which made them the second largest ethnic group after English Americans.

From the American Revolution to the Civil War

During the 1770s, Africans, both enslaved and free, helped rebellious American colonists secure their independence by defeating the British in the American Revolutionary War. Blacks played a role in both sides in the American Revolution. Activists in the Patriot cause included James Armistead, Prince Whipple, and Oliver Cromwell. Around 15,000 Black Loyalists left with the British after the war, most of them ending up as free Black people in England or its colonies, such as the Black Nova Scotians  and the Sierra Leone Creole people.

In the Spanish Louisiana, Governor Bernardo de Gálvez organized Spanish free Black men into two militia companies to defend New Orleans during the American Revolution. They fought in the 1779 battle in which Spain captured Baton Rouge from the British. Gálvez also commanded them in campaigns against the British outposts in Mobile, Alabama, and Pensacola, Florida. He recruited slaves for the militia by pledging to free anyone who was seriously wounded and promised to secure a low price for coartación (buy their freedom and that of others) for those who received lesser wounds. During the 1790s, Governor Francisco Luis Héctor, baron of Carondelet reinforced local fortifications and recruit even more free Black men for the militia. Carondelet doubled the number of free Black men who served, creating two more militia companies—one made up of Black members and the other of pardo (mixed race). Serving in the militia brought free Black men one step closer to equality with Whites, allowing them, for example, the right to carry arms and boosting their earning power. However, actually these privileges distanced free Black men from enslaved Blacks and encouraged them to identify with Whites.

Slavery had been tacitly enshrined in the U.S. Constitution through provisions such as Article I, Section 2, Clause 3, commonly known as the 3/5 compromise. Because of Section 9, Clause 1, Congress was unable to pass an Act Prohibiting Importation of Slaves until 1807. Fugitive slave laws (derived from the Fugitive Slave Clause of the Constitution—Article IV, Section 2, Clause 3) were passed by Congress in 1793 and 1850, guaranteeing the right for a slaveholder to recover an escaped slave within the U.S. Slave owners, who viewed slaves as property, made it a federal crime to assist those who had escaped slavery or to interfere with their capture. Slavery, which by then meant almost exclusively Black people, was the most important political issue in the Antebellum United States, leading to one crisis after another. Among these were the Missouri Compromise, the Compromise of 1850, the Dred Scott decision, and John Brown's raid on Harpers Ferry.

Prior to the Civil War, eight serving presidents owned slaves, a practice protected by the U.S. Constitution. By 1860, there were 3.5 to 4.4 million enslaved Black people in the U.S. due to the Atlantic slave trade, and another 488,000–500,000 Blacks lived free (with legislated limits) across the country. With legislated limits imposed upon them in addition to "unconquerable prejudice" from Whites according to Henry Clay, some Black people who were not enslaved left the U.S. for Liberia in West Africa. Liberia began as a settlement of the American Colonization Society (ACS) in 1821, with the abolitionist members of the ACS believing Blacks would face better chances for freedom and equality in Africa.

The slaves not only constituted a large investment, they produced America's most valuable product and export: cotton. They not only helped build the U.S. Capitol, they built the White House and other District of Columbia buildings. (See Slavery in the District of Columbia.) Similar building projects existed in the slave states.

By 1815, the domestic slave trade had become a major economic activity in the United States; it lasted until the 1860s. Historians estimate nearly one million in total took part in the forced migration of this new "Middle Passage". The historian Ira Berlin called this forced migration of slaves the "central event" in the life of a slave between the American Revolution and the Civil War, writing that whether slaves were directly uprooted or lived in fear that they or their families would be involuntarily moved, "the massive deportation traumatized black people". Individuals lost their connection to families and clans, and many ethnic Africans lost their knowledge of varying tribal origins in Africa.

The 1863 photograph of Wilson Chinn, a branded slave from Louisiana, like the one of Gordon and his scarred back, served as two early examples of how the newborn medium of photography could encapsulate the cruelty of slavery.

Emigration of free Blacks to their continent of origin had been proposed since the Revolutionary war. After Haiti became independent, it tried to recruit African Americans to migrate there after it re-established trade relations with the United States. The Haitian Union was a group formed to promote relations between the countries. After riots against Blacks in Cincinnati, its Black community sponsored founding of the Wilberforce Colony, an initially successful settlement of African American immigrants to Canada. The colony was one of the first such independent political entities. It lasted for a number of decades and provided a destination for about 200 Black families emigrating from a number of locations in the United States.

In 1863, during the American Civil War, President Abraham Lincoln signed the Emancipation Proclamation. The proclamation declared that all slaves in Confederate-held territory were free. Advancing Union troops enforced the proclamation, with Texas being the last state to be emancipated, in 1865.

Slavery in Union-held Confederate territory continued, at least on paper, until the passage of the Thirteenth Amendment in 1865. While the Naturalization Act of 1790 limited U.S. citizenship to Whites only, the 14th Amendment (1868) gave Black people citizenship, and the 15th Amendment (1870) gave Black males the right to vote (which would still be denied to all women until 1920).

Reconstruction era and Jim Crow

African Americans quickly set up congregations for themselves, as well as schools and community/civic associations, to have space away from White control or oversight. While the post-war Reconstruction era was initially a time of progress for African Americans, that period ended in 1876. By the late 1890s, Southern states enacted Jim Crow laws to enforce racial segregation and disenfranchisement. Segregation, which began with slavery, continued with Jim Crow laws, with signs used to show Blacks where they could legally walk, talk, drink, rest, or eat. For those places that were racially mixed, non-Whites had to wait until all White customers were dealt with. Most African Americans obeyed the Jim Crow laws, to avoid racially motivated violence. To maintain self-esteem and dignity, African Americans such as Anthony Overton and Mary McLeod Bethune continued to build their own schools, churches, banks, social clubs, and other businesses.

In the last decade of the 19th century, racially discriminatory laws and racial violence aimed at African Americans began to mushroom in the United States, a period often referred to as the "nadir of American race relations". These discriminatory acts included racial segregation—upheld by the United States Supreme Court decision in Plessy v. Ferguson in 1896—which was legally mandated by southern states and nationwide at the local level of government, voter suppression or disenfranchisement in the southern states, denial of economic opportunity or resources nationwide, and private acts of violence and mass racial violence aimed at African Americans unhindered or encouraged by government authorities.

Great migration and civil rights movement

The desperate conditions of African Americans in the South sparked the Great Migration during the first half of the 20th century which led to a growing African American community in Northern and Western United States. The rapid influx of Blacks disturbed the racial balance within Northern and Western cities, exacerbating hostility between both Blacks and Whites in the two regions. The Red Summer of 1919 was marked by hundreds of deaths and higher casualties across the U.S. as a result of race riots that occurred in more than three dozen cities, such as the Chicago race riot of 1919 and the Omaha race riot of 1919. Overall, Blacks in Northern and Western cities experienced systemic discrimination in a plethora of aspects of life. Within employment, economic opportunities for Blacks were routed to the lowest-status and restrictive in potential mobility. At the 1900 Hampton Negro Conference, Reverend Matthew Anderson said: "...the lines along most of the avenues of wage earning are more rigidly drawn in the North than in the South." Within the housing market, stronger discriminatory measures were used in correlation to the influx, resulting in a mix of "targeted violence, restrictive covenants, redlining and racial steering". While many Whites defended their space with violence, intimidation, or legal tactics toward African Americans, many other Whites migrated to more racially homogeneous suburban or exurban regions, a process known as White flight.

Despite discrimination, drawing cards for leaving the hopelessness in the South were the growth of African American institutions and communities in Northern cities. Institutions included Black oriented organizations (e.g., Urban League, NAACP), churches, businesses, and newspapers, as well as successes in the development in African American intellectual culture, music, and popular culture (e.g., Harlem Renaissance, Chicago Black Renaissance). The Cotton Club in Harlem was a Whites-only establishment, with Blacks (such as Duke Ellington) allowed to perform, but to a White audience. Black Americans also found a new ground for political power in Northern cities, without the enforced disabilities of Jim Crow.

By the 1950s, the civil rights movement was gaining momentum. A 1955 lynching that sparked public outrage about injustice was that of Emmett Till, a 14-year-old boy from Chicago. Spending the summer with relatives in Money, Mississippi, Till was killed for allegedly having wolf-whistled at a White woman. Till had been badly beaten, one of his eyes was gouged out, and he was shot in the head. The visceral response to his mother's decision to have an open-casket funeral mobilized the Black community throughout the U.S. Vann R. Newkirk wrote "the trial of his killers became a pageant illuminating the tyranny of White supremacy". The state of Mississippi tried two defendants, but they were speedily acquitted by an all-White jury. One hundred days after Emmett Till's murder, Rosa Parks refused to give up her seat on the bus in Alabama—indeed, Parks told Emmett's mother Mamie Till that "the photograph of Emmett's disfigured face in the casket was set in her mind when she refused to give up her seat on the Montgomery bus."

The March on Washington for Jobs and Freedom and the conditions which brought it into being are credited with putting pressure on presidents John F. Kennedy and Lyndon B. Johnson. Johnson put his support behind passage of the Civil Rights Act of 1964 that banned discrimination in public accommodations, employment, and labor unions, and the Voting Rights Act of 1965, which expanded federal authority over states to ensure Black political participation through protection of voter registration and elections. By 1966, the emergence of the Black Power movement, which lasted from 1966 to 1975, expanded upon the aims of the civil rights movement to include economic and political self-sufficiency, and freedom from White authority.

During the post-war period, many African Americans continued to be economically disadvantaged relative to other Americans. Average Black income stood at 54 percent of that of White workers in 1947, and 55 percent in 1962. In 1959, median family income for Whites was $5,600, compared with $2,900 for non-White families. In 1965, 43 percent of all Black families fell into the poverty bracket, earning under $3,000 a year. The Sixties saw improvements in the social and economic conditions of many Black Americans.

From 1965 to 1969, Black family income rose from 54 to 60 percent of White family income. In 1968, 23 percent of Black families earned under $3,000 a year, compared with 41 percent in 1960. In 1965, 19 percent of Black Americans had incomes equal to the national median, a proportion that rose to 27 percent by 1967. In 1960, the median level of education for Blacks had been 10.8 years, and by the late Sixties the figure rose to 12.2 years, half a year behind the median for Whites.

Post–civil rights era

Politically and economically, African Americans have made substantial strides during the post–civil rights era. In 1967, Thurgood Marshall became the first African American Supreme Court Justice. In 1968, Shirley Chisholm became the first Black woman elected to the U.S. Congress. In 1989, Douglas Wilder became the first African American elected governor in U.S. history. Clarence Thomas succeeded Marshall to become the second African American Supreme Court Justice in 1991. In 1992, Carol Moseley-Braun of Illinois became the first African American woman elected to the U.S. Senate. There were 8,936 Black officeholders in the United States in 2000, showing a net increase of 7,467 since 1970. In 2001, there were 484 Black mayors.

In 2005, the number of Africans immigrating to the United States, in a single year, surpassed the peak number who were involuntarily brought to the United States during the Atlantic Slave Trade. On November 4, 2008, Democratic Senator Barack Obama defeated Republican Senator John McCain to become the first African American to be elected president. At least 95 percent of African American voters voted for Obama. He also received overwhelming support from young and educated Whites, a majority of Asians, and Hispanics, picking up a number of new states in the Democratic electoral column. Obama lost the overall White vote, although he won a larger proportion of White votes than any previous nonincumbent Democratic presidential candidate since Jimmy Carter. Obama was reelected for a second and final term, by a similar margin on November 6, 2012. In 2021, Kamala Harris became the first woman, the first African American, and the first Asian American to serve as Vice President of the United States.

Demographics

In 1790, when the first U.S. census was taken, Africans (including slaves and free people) numbered about 760,000—about 19.3% of the population. In 1860, at the start of the Civil War, the African American population had increased to 4.4 million, but the percentage rate dropped to 14% of the overall population of the country. The vast majority were slaves, with only 488,000 counted as "freemen". By 1900, the Black population had doubled and reached 8.8 million.

In 1910, about 90% of African Americans lived in the South. Large numbers began migrating north looking for better job opportunities and living conditions, and to escape Jim Crow laws and racial violence. The Great Migration, as it was called, spanned the 1890s to the 1970s. From 1916 through the 1960s, more than 6 million Black people moved north. But in the 1970s and 1980s, that trend reversed, with more African Americans moving south to the Sun Belt than leaving it.

The following table of the African American population in the United States over time shows that the African American population, as a percentage of the total population, declined until 1930 and has been rising since then.

By 1990, the African American population reached about 30 million and represented 12% of the U.S. population, roughly the same proportion as in 1900.

At the time of the 2000 U.S. census, 54.8% of African Americans lived in the South. In that year, 17.6% of African Americans lived in the Northeast and 18.7% in the Midwest, while only 8.9% lived in the Western states. The west does have a sizable Black population in certain areas, however. California, the nation's most populous state, has the fifth largest African American population, only behind New York, Texas, Georgia, and Florida. According to the 2000 Census, approximately 2.05% of African Americans identified as Hispanic or Latino in origin, many of whom may be of Brazilian, Puerto Rican, Dominican, Cuban, Haitian, or other Latin American descent. The only self-reported ancestral groups larger than African Americans are the Irish and Germans.

According to the 2010 census, nearly 3% of people who self-identified as Black had recent ancestors who immigrated from another country. Self-reported non-Hispanic Black immigrants from the Caribbean, mostly from Jamaica and Haiti, represented 0.9% of the U.S. population, at 2.6 million. Self-reported Black immigrants from sub-Saharan Africa also represented 0.9%, at about 2.8 million. Additionally, self-identified Black Hispanics represented 0.4% of the United States population, at about 1.2 million people, largely found within the Puerto Rican and Dominican communities. Self-reported Black immigrants hailing from other countries in the Americas, such as Brazil and Canada, as well as several European countries, represented less than 0.1% of the population. Mixed-race Hispanic and non-Hispanic Americans who identified as being part Black, represented 0.9% of the population. Of the 12.6% of United States residents who identified as Black, around 10.3% were "native Black American" or ethnic African Americans, who are direct descendants of West/Central Africans brought to the U.S. as slaves. These individuals make up well over 80% of all Blacks in the country. When including people of mixed-race origin, about 13.5% of the U.S. population self-identified as Black or "mixed with Black". However, according to the U.S. Census Bureau, evidence from the 2000 census indicates that many African and Caribbean immigrant ethnic groups do not identify as "Black, African Am., or Negro". Instead, they wrote in their own respective ethnic groups in the "Some Other Race" write-in entry. As a result, the census bureau devised a new, separate "African American" ethnic group category in 2010 for ethnic African Americans.

Historically, African Americans have been undercounted in the U.S. census due to a number of factors and biases.  In the 2020 census, the African American population was undercounted at an estimated rate of 3.3%, up from 2.1% in 2010.

U.S. cities

After 100 years of African Americans leaving the south in large numbers seeking better opportunities and treatment in the west and north, a movement known as the Great Migration, there is now a reverse trend, called the New Great Migration. As with the earlier Great Migration, the New Great Migration is primarily directed toward cities and large urban areas, such as Atlanta, Charlotte, Houston, Dallas, Raleigh, Tampa, San Antonio, Memphis, Nashville, Jacksonville, and so forth. A growing percentage of African Americans from the west and north are migrating to the southern region of the U.S. for economic and cultural reasons. New York City, Chicago, and Los Angeles have the highest decline in African Americans, while Atlanta, Dallas, and Houston have the highest increase respectively.

Among cities of 100,000 or more, Detroit, Michigan had the highest percentage of Black residents of any U.S. city in 2010, with 82%. Other large cities with African American majorities include Jackson, Mississippi (79.4%), Miami Gardens, Florida (76.3%), Baltimore, Maryland (63%), Birmingham, Alabama (62.5%), Memphis, Tennessee (61%), New Orleans, Louisiana (60%), Montgomery, Alabama (56.6%), Flint, Michigan (56.6%), Savannah, Georgia (55.0%), Augusta, Georgia (54.7%), Atlanta, Georgia (54%, see African Americans in Atlanta), Cleveland, Ohio (53.3%), Newark, New Jersey (52.35%), Washington, D.C. (50.7%), Richmond, Virginia (50.6%), Mobile, Alabama (50.6%), Baton Rouge, Louisiana (50.4%), and Shreveport, Louisiana (50.4%).

The nation's most affluent community with an African American majority resides in View Park–Windsor Hills, California with an annual median household income of $159,618. Other largely affluent and African American communities include Prince George's County (namely Mitchellville, Woodmore, Upper Marlboro) and Charles County in Maryland, Dekalb County (namely Stonecrest, Lithonia, Smoke Rise) and South Fulton in Georgia, Charles City County in Virginia, Baldwin Hills in California, Hillcrest and Uniondale in New York, and Cedar Hill, DeSoto, and Missouri City in Texas. Queens County, New York is the only county with a population of 65,000 or more where African Americans have a higher median household income than White Americans.

Seatack, Virginia is currently the oldest African American community in the United States. It survives today with a vibrant and active civic community.

Education

During slavery, anti-literacy laws were enacted in the U.S. that prohibited education for Black people. Slave owners saw literacy as a threat to the institution of slavery. As a North Carolina statute stated, "Teaching slaves to read and write, tends to excite dissatisfaction in their minds, and to produce insurrection and rebellion."

When slavery was finally abolished in 1865, public educational systems were expanding across the country. By 1870, around seventy-four institutions in the south provided a form of advanced education for African American students. By 1900, over a hundred programs at these schools provided training for Black professionals, including teachers. Many of the students at Fisk University, including the young W. E. B. Du Bois, taught school during the summers to support their studies.

African Americans were very concerned to provide quality education for their children, but White supremacy limited their ability to participate in educational policymaking on the political level. State governments soon moved to undermine their citizenship by restricting their right to vote. By the late 1870s, Blacks were disenfranchised and segregated across the American South. White politicians in Mississippi and other states withheld financial resources and supplies from Black schools. Nevertheless, the presence of Black teachers, and their engagement with their communities both inside and outside the classroom, ensured that Black students had access to education despite these external constraints.

During World War II, demands for unity and racial tolerance on the home front provided an opening for the first Black history curriculum in the country. For example, during the early 1940s, Madeline Morgan, a Black teacher in the Chicago public schools, created a curriculum for students in grades one through eight highlighting the contributions of Black people to the history of the United States. At the close of the war, Chicago's Board of Education downgraded the curriculum's status from mandatory to optional.

Predominantly Black schools for kindergarten through twelfth grade students were common throughout the U.S. before the 1970s. By 1972, however, desegregation efforts meant that only 25% of Black students were in schools with more than 90% non-White students. However, since then, a trend towards re-segregation affected communities across the country: by 2011, 2.9 million African American students were in such overwhelmingly minority schools, including 53% of Black students in school districts that were formerly under desegregation orders.

As late as 1947, about one third of African Americans over 65 were considered to lack the literacy to read and write their own names. By 1969, illiteracy as it had been traditionally defined, had been largely eradicated among younger African Americans.

U.S. census surveys showed that by 1998, 89 percent of African Americans aged 25 to 29 had completed a high-school education, less than Whites or Asians, but more than Hispanics. On many college entrance, standardized tests and grades, African Americans have historically lagged behind Whites, but some studies suggest that the achievement gap has been closing. Many policy makers have proposed that this gap can and will be eliminated through policies such as affirmative action, desegregation, and multiculturalism.

Between 1995 and 2009, freshmen college enrollment for African Americans increased by 73 percent and only 15 percent for Whites. Black women are enrolled in college more than any other race and gender group, leading all with 9.7% enrolled according to the 2011 U.S. Census Bureau. 
The average high school graduation rate of Blacks in the United States has steadily increased to 71% in 2013. Separating this statistic into component parts shows it varies greatly depending upon the state and the school district examined. 38% of Black males graduated in the state of New York but in Maine 97% graduated and exceeded the White male graduation rate by 11 percentage points. In much of the southeastern United States and some parts of the southwestern United States the graduation rate of White males was in fact below 70% such as in Florida where 62% of White males graduated from high school. Examining specific school districts paints an even more complex picture. In the Detroit school district the graduation rate of Black males was 20% but 7% for White males. In the New York City school district 28% of Black males graduate from high school compared to 57% of White males. In Newark County 76% of Black males graduated compared to 67% for White males. Further academic improvement has occurred in 2015. Roughly 23% of all Blacks have bachelor's degrees. In 1988, 21% of Whites had obtained a bachelor's degree versus 11% of Blacks. In 2015, 23% of Blacks had obtained a bachelor's degree versus 36% of Whites. Foreign born Blacks, 9% of the Black population, made even greater strides. They exceed native born Blacks by 10 percentage points.

College Board, which runs the official college-level advanced placement (AP) programs in American high schools, have has received criticism in recent years that its curricula have focused too much on Euro-centric history. In 2020, College Board reshaped some curricula among history-based courses to further reflect the African diaspora. In 2021, College Board announced it would be piloting an AP African American Studies course between 2022 and 2024. The course is expected to launch in 2024.

Historically Black colleges and universities

Historically Black colleges and universities (HBCUs), which were founded when segregated institutions of higher learning did not admit African Americans, continue to thrive and educate students of all races today. There are 101 HBCUs representing three percent of the nation's colleges and universities with the majority established in the Southeast. HBCUs have been largely responsible for establishing and expanding the African American middle-class by providing opportunities not usually given to African Americans.

Economic status

African Americans' economic status has improved some since the civil rights era. The racial disparity in poverty rates has narrowed.  The poverty rate among African Americans has decreased from 24.7% in 2004 to 18.8% in 2020, compared to 10.5% for all Americans. Poverty is associated with higher rates of marital stress and dissolution, physical and mental health problems, disability, cognitive deficits, low educational attainment, and crime.

African Americans have a long and diverse history of business ownership. Although the first African American business is unknown, slaves captured from West Africa are believed to have established commercial enterprises as peddlers and skilled craftspeople as far back as the 17th century. Around 1900, Booker T. Washington became the most famous proponent of African American businesses. His critic and rival W. E. B. DuBois also commended business as a vehicle for African American advancement.

African Americans have a combined buying power of over $892 billion currently and likely over $1.1 trillion by 2012. In 2002, African American-owned businesses accounted for 1.2 million of the US's 23 million businesses.  African American-owned businesses account for approximately 2 million US businesses. Black-owned businesses experienced the largest growth in number of businesses among minorities from 2002 to 2011.

Twenty-five percent of Blacks had white-collar occupations (management, professional, and related fields) in 2000, compared with 33.6% of Americans overall. In 2001, over half of African American households of married couples earned $50,000 or more. Although in the same year African Americans were over-represented among the nation's poor, this was directly related to the disproportionate percentage of African American families headed by single women; such families are collectively poorer, regardless of ethnicity.

In 2006, the median earnings of African American men was more than Black and non-Black American women overall, and in all educational levels. At the same time, among American men, income disparities were significant; the median income of African American men was approximately 76 cents for every dollar of their European American counterparts, although the gap narrowed somewhat with a rise in educational level.

Overall, the median earnings of African American men were 72 cents for every dollar earned of their Asian American counterparts, and $1.17 for every dollar earned by Hispanic men. On the other hand, by 2006, among American women with post-secondary education, African American women have made significant advances; the median income of African American women was more than those of their Asian-, European- and Hispanic American counterparts with at least some college education.

The U.S. public sector is the single most important source of employment for African Americans. During 2008–2010, 21.2% of all Black workers were public employees, compared with 16.3% of non-Black workers. Both before and after the onset of the Great Recession, African Americans were 30% more likely than other workers to be employed in the public sector. The public sector is also a critical source of decent-paying jobs for Black Americans. For both men and women, the median wage earned by Black employees is significantly higher in the public sector than in other industries.

In 1999, the median income of African American families was $33,255 compared to $53,356 of European Americans. In times of economic hardship for the nation, African Americans suffer disproportionately from job loss and underemployment, with the Black underclass being hardest hit. The phrase "last hired and first fired" is reflected in the Bureau of Labor Statistics unemployment figures. Nationwide, the October 2008 unemployment rate for African Americans was 11.1%, while the nationwide rate was 6.5%. In 2007, the average income for African Americans was approximately $34,000, compared to $55,000 for Whites. African Americans experience a higher rate of unemployment than the general population.

The income gap between Black and White families is also significant. In 2005, employed Blacks earned 65% of the wages of Whites, down from 82% in 1975. The New York Times reported in 2006 that in Queens, New York, the median income among African American families exceeded that of White families, which the newspaper attributed to the growth in the number of two-parent Black families. It noted that Queens was the only county with more than 65,000 residents where that was true. In 2011, it was reported that 72% of Black babies were born to unwed mothers. The poverty rate among single-parent Black families was 39.5% in 2005, according to Walter E. Williams, while it was 9.9% among married-couple Black families. Among White families, the respective rates were 26.4% and 6% in poverty.

Collectively, African Americans are more involved in the American political process than other minority groups in the United States, indicated by the highest level of voter registration and participation in elections among these groups in 2004. African Americans also have the highest level of Congressional representation of any minority group in the U.S.

African American homeownership

Homeownership in the U.S. is the strongest indicator of financial stability and the primary asset most Americans use to generate wealth. African Americans continue to lag behind other racial groups in becoming homeowners. In the first quarter of 2021, 45.1% of African Americans owned their homes, compared to 65.3% of all Americans. The African American homeownership rate has remained relatively flat since the 1970s despite an increase in anti-discrimination housing laws and protections.  The average white high-school drop-out still has a slightly better chance of owning a home than the average African American college graduate.  Since 2000, fast-growing housing costs in most cities have made it even more difficult for the African-American homeownership rate to significantly grow and reach over 50% for the first time in history. From 2000 to 2022, the median home price in the U.S. grew 160%, outpacing average annual household income growth in that same period, which only grew about 30%.

Politics
Since the mid 20th century, a large majority of African Americans support the Democratic Party. In the 2020 Presidential election,  91% of African American voters supported Democrat Joe Biden, while 8% supported Republican Donald Trump. Although there is an African American lobby in foreign policy, it has not had the impact that African American organizations have had in domestic policy.

Many African Americans were excluded from electoral politics in the decades following the end of Reconstruction. For those that could participate, until the New Deal, African Americans were supporters of the Republican Party because it was Republican President Abraham Lincoln who helped in granting freedom to American slaves; at the time, the Republicans and Democrats represented the sectional interests of the North and South, respectively, rather than any specific ideology, and both conservative and liberal were represented equally in both parties.

The African American trend of voting for Democrats can be traced back to the 1930s during the Great Depression, when Franklin D. Roosevelt's New Deal program provided economic relief to African Americans. Roosevelt's New Deal coalition turned the Democratic Party into an organization of the working class and their liberal allies, regardless of region. The African American vote became even more solidly Democratic when Democratic presidents John F. Kennedy and Lyndon B. Johnson pushed for civil rights legislation during the 1960s. In 1960, nearly a third of African Americans voted for Republican Richard Nixon.

Black national anthem

"Lift Every Voice and Sing" is often referred to as the Black national anthem in the United States. In 1919, the National Association for the Advancement of Colored People (NAACP) had dubbed it the "Negro national anthem" for its power in voicing a cry for liberation and affirmation for African American people.

Sexuality

According to a Gallup survey, 4.6% of Black or African Americans self-identified as LGBT in 2016, while the total portion of American adults in all ethnic groups identifying as LGBT was 4.1% in 2016.

Health

General
The life expectancy for Black men in 2008 was 70.8 years. Life expectancy for Black women was 77.5 years in 2008. In 1900, when information on Black life expectancy started being collated, a Black man could expect to live to 32.5 years and a Black woman 33.5 years. In 1900, White men lived an average of 46.3 years and White women lived an average of 48.3 years. African American life expectancy at birth is persistently five to seven years lower than European Americans. Black men have shorter lifespans than any other group in the US besides Native American men.

Black people have higher rates of obesity, diabetes, and hypertension than the U.S. average. For adult Black men, the rate of obesity was 31.6% in 2010. For adult Black women, the rate of obesity was 41.2% in 2010. African Americans have higher rates of mortality than any other racial or ethnic group for 8 of the top 10 causes of death. In 2013, among men, Black men had the highest rate of getting cancer, followed by White, Hispanic, Asian/Pacific Islander (A/PI), and American Indian/Alaska Native (AI/AN) men. Among women, White women had the highest rate of getting cancer, followed by Black, Hispanic, Asian/Pacific Islander, and American Indian/Alaska Native women. African Americans also have higher prevalence and incidence of Alzheimer's disease compared to the overall average.

Violence has an impact upon African American life expectancy. A report from the U.S. Department of Justice states "In 2005, homicide victimization rates for blacks were 6 times higher than the rates for whites". The report also found that "94% of black victims were killed by blacks." Black boys and men age 15–44 are the only race/sex category for which homicide is a top-five cause of death.

In December 2020, African Americans were less likely to be vaccinated against COVID-19 due to mistrust in the U.S. medical system related to decades of abuses and anti-black treatment. From 2021 to 2022, there was an increase in African Americans who became vaccinated. Still, in 2022, COVID-19 complications became the third leading cause of death for African Americans.

Sexual health
According to the Centers for Disease Control and Prevention, African Americans have higher rates of sexually transmitted infections (STIs) compared to Whites, with 5 times the rates of syphilis and chlamydia, and 7.5 times the rate of gonorrhea.

The disproportionately high incidence of HIV/AIDS among African Americans has been attributed to homophobic influences and lack of access to proper healthcare. The prevalence of HIV/AIDS among Black men is seven times higher than the prevalence for White men, and Black men are more than nine times as likely to die from HIV/AIDS-related illness than White men.

Mental health 
African Americans have several barriers for accessing mental health services. Counseling has been frowned upon and distant in utility and proximity to many people in the African American community. In 2004, a qualitative research study explored the disconnect with African Americans and mental health. The study was conducted as a semi-structured discussion which allowed the focus group to express their opinions and life experiences. The results revealed a couple key variables that create barriers for many African American communities to seek mental health services such as the stigma, lack of four important necessities; trust, affordability, cultural understanding and impersonal services.

Historically, many African American communities did not seek counseling because religion was a part of the family values. African American who have a faith background are more likely to seek prayer as a coping mechanism for mental issues rather than seeking professional mental health services. In 2015 a study concluded, African Americans with high value in religion are less likely to utilize mental health services compared to those who have low value in religion.

Most counseling approaches are westernized and do not fit within the African American culture. African American families tend to resolve concerns within the family, and it is viewed by the family as a strength. On the other hand, when African Americans seek counseling, they face a social backlash and are criticized. They may be labeled "crazy", viewed as weak, and their pride is diminished. Because of this, many African Americans instead seek mentorship within communities they trust.

Terminology is another barrier in relation to African Americans and mental health. There is more stigma on the term psychotherapy versus counseling. In one study, psychotherapy is associated with mental illness whereas counseling approaches problem-solving, guidance and help. More African Americans seek assistance when it is called counseling and not psychotherapy because it is more welcoming within the cultural and community. Counselors are encouraged to be aware of such barriers for the well-being of African American clients. Without cultural competency training in health care, many African Americans go unheard and misunderstood.

Although suicide is a top-10 cause of death for men overall in the US, it is not a top-10 cause of death for Black men.

Genetics

Genome-wide studies 

Recent surveys of African Americans using a genetic testing service have found varied ancestries which show different tendencies by region and sex of ancestors. These studies found that on average, African Americans have 73.2–82.1% West African, 16.7%–24% European, and 0.8–1.2% Native American genetic ancestry, with large variation between individuals. Genetics websites themselves have reported similar ranges, with some finding 1 or 2 percent Native American ancestry and Ancestry.com reporting an outlying percentage of European ancestry among African Americans, 29%.

According to a genome-wide study by Bryc et al. (2009), the mixed ancestry of African Americans in varying ratios came about as the result of sexual contact between West/Central Africans (more frequently females) and Europeans (more frequently males). Consequently, the 365 African Americans in their sample have a genome-wide average of 78.1% West African ancestry and 18.5% European ancestry, with large variation among individuals (ranging from 99% to 1% West African ancestry). The West African ancestral component in African Americans is most similar to that in present-day speakers from the non-Bantu branches of the Niger-Congo (Niger-Kordofanian) family.

Correspondingly, Montinaro et al. (2014) observed that around 50% of the overall ancestry of African Americans traces back to the Niger-Congo-speaking Yoruba of southwestern Nigeria and southern Benin, reflecting the centrality of this West African region in the Atlantic Slave Trade. The next most frequent ancestral component found among African Americans was derived from Great Britain, in keeping with historical records. It constitutes a little over 10% of their overall ancestry, and is most similar to the Northwest European ancestral component also carried by Barbadians. Zakharaia et al. (2009) found a similar proportion of Yoruba associated ancestry in their African American samples, with a minority also drawn from Mandenka and Bantu populations. Additionally, the researchers observed an average European ancestry of 21.9%, again with significant variation between individuals. Bryc et al. (2009) note that populations from other parts of the continent may also constitute adequate proxies for the ancestors of some African American individuals; namely, ancestral populations from Guinea Bissau, Senegal and Sierra Leone in West Africa and Angola in Southern Africa.

Altogether, genetic studies suggest that African Americans are a genetically diverse people. According to DNA analysis led in 2006 by Penn State geneticist Mark D. Shriver, around 58 percent of African Americans have at least 12.5% European ancestry (equivalent to one European great-grandparent and his/her forebears), 19.6 percent of African Americans have at least 25% European ancestry (equivalent to one European grandparent and his/her forebears), and 1 percent of African Americans have at least 50% European ancestry (equivalent to one European parent and his/her forebears). According to Shriver, around 5 percent of African Americans also have at least 12.5% Native American ancestry (equivalent to one Native American great-grandparent and his/her forebears). Research suggests that Native American ancestry among people who identify as African American is a result of relationships that occurred soon after slave ships arrived in the American colonies, and European ancestry is of more recent origin, often from the decades before the Civil War.

Y-DNA
Africans bearing the E-V38 (E1b1a) likely traversed across the Sahara, from east to west, approximately 19,000 years ago. E-M2 (E1b1a1) likely originated in West Africa or Central Africa. According to a Y-DNA study by Sims et al. (2007), the majority (≈60%) of African Americans belong to various subclades of the E-M2 (E1b1a1, formerly E3a) paternal haplogroup. This is the most common genetic paternal lineage found today among West/Central African males, and is also a signature of the historical Bantu migrations. The next most frequent Y-DNA haplogroup observed among African Americans is the R1b clade, which around 15% of African Americans carry. This lineage is most common today among Northwestern European males. The remaining African Americans mainly belong to the paternal haplogroup I (≈7%), which is also frequent in Northwestern Europe.

mtDNA
According to an mtDNA study by Salas et al. (2005), the maternal lineages of African Americans are most similar to haplogroups that are today especially common in West Africa (>55%), followed closely by West-Central Africa and Southwestern Africa (<41%). The characteristic West African haplogroups L1b, L2b,c,d, and L3b,d and West-Central African haplogroups L1c and L3e in particular occur at high frequencies among African Americans. As with the paternal DNA of African Americans, contributions from other parts of the continent to their maternal gene pool are insignificant.

Social status

Formal political, economic and social discrimination against minorities has been present throughout American history. Leland T. Saito, Associate Professor of Sociology and American Studies & Ethnicity at the University of Southern California, writes, "Political rights have been circumscribed by race, class and gender since the founding of the United States, when the right to vote was restricted to White men of property. Throughout the history of the United States race has been used by Whites for legitimizing and creating difference and social, economic and political exclusion."

Although they have gained a greater degree of social equality since the civil rights movement, African Americans have remained stagnant economically, which has hindered their ability to break into the middle class and beyond. As of 2020, the racial wealth gap between Whites and Blacks remains as large as it was in 1968, with the typical net worth of a White household equivalent to that of 11.5 black households. Despite this, African Americans have increased employment rates and gained representation in the highest levels of American government in the post–civil rights era. However, widespread racism remains an issue that continues to undermine the development of social status.

Policing and criminal justice

Forty percent of prison inmates are African American. African American males are more likely to be killed by police when compared to other races. This is one of the factors that led to the creation of the Black Lives Matter movement in 2013. A historical issue in the U.S. where women have weaponized their White privilege in the country by reporting on Black people, often instigating racial violence, White women calling the police on Black people became widely publicized in 2020. In African American culture there is a long history of calling a meddlesome White woman by a certain name, while The Guardian called 2020 "the year of Karen".

Although in the last decade Black youth have had lower rates of cannabis (marijuana) consumption than Whites of the same age, they have disproportionately higher arrest rates than Whites: in 2010, for example, Blacks were 3.73 times as likely to get arrested for using cannabis than Whites, despite not significantly more frequently being users.

Social issues
After over 50 years, marriage rates for all Americans began to decline while divorce rates and out-of-wedlock births have climbed. These changes have been greatest among African Americans. After more than 70 years of racial parity Black marriage rates began to fall behind Whites. Single-parent households have become common, and according to U.S. census figures released in January 2010, only 38 percent of Black children live with both their parents.

The first ever anti-miscegenation law was passed by the Maryland General Assembly in 1691, criminalizing interracial marriage. In a speech in Charleston, Illinois in 1858, Abraham Lincoln stated, "I am not, nor ever have been in favor of making voters or jurors of negroes, nor of qualifying them to hold office, nor to intermarry with white people". By the late 1800s, 38 US states had anti-miscegenation statutes. By 1924, the ban on interracial marriage was still in force in 29 states. While interracial marriage had been legal in California since 1948, in 1957 actor Sammy Davis Jr. faced a backlash for his involvement with White actress Kim Novak. Harry Cohn, the president of Columbia Pictures (with whom Novak was under contract) gave in to his concerns that a racist backlash against the relationship could hurt the studio. Davis briefly married Black dancer Loray White in 1958 to protect himself from mob violence. Inebriated at the wedding ceremony, Davis despairingly said to his best friend, Arthur Silber Jr., "Why won't they let me live my life?" The couple never lived together, and commenced divorce proceedings in September 1958. In 1958, officers in Virginia entered the home of Mildred and Richard Loving and dragged them out of bed for living together as an interracial couple, on the basis that "any white person intermarry with a colored person"—or vice versa—each party "shall be guilty of a felony" and face prison terms of five years. In 1967 the law was ruled unconstitutional (via the 14th Amendment adopted in 1868) by the U.S. Supreme Court in Loving v. Virginia.

In 2008, Democrats overwhelmingly voted 70% against California Proposition 8, African Americans voted 58% in favor of it while 42% voted against Proposition 8. On May 9, 2012, Barack Obama, the first Black president, became the first U.S. president to support same-sex marriage. Since Obama's endorsement there has been a rapid growth in support for same-sex marriage among African Americans. As of 2012, 59% of African Americans support same-sex marriage, which is higher than support among the national average (53%) and White Americans (50%).

Polls in North Carolina, Pennsylvania, Missouri, Maryland, Ohio, Florida, and Nevada have also shown an increase in support for same sex marriage among African Americans. On November 6, 2012, Maryland, Maine, and Washington all voted for approve of same-sex marriage, along with Minnesota rejecting a constitutional amendment banning same-sex marriage. Exit polls in Maryland show about 50% of African Americans voted for same-sex marriage, showing a vast evolution among African Americans on the issue and was crucial in helping pass same-sex marriage in Maryland.

Black Americans hold far more conservative opinions on abortion, extramarital sex, and raising children out of wedlock than Democrats as a whole. On financial issues, however, African Americans are in line with Democrats, generally supporting a more progressive tax structure to provide more government spending on social services.

Political legacy

African Americans have fought in every war in the history of the United States.

The gains made by African Americans in the civil rights movement and in the Black Power movement not only obtained certain rights for African Americans, but changed American society in far-reaching and fundamentally important ways. Prior to the 1950s, Black Americans in the South were subject to de jure discrimination, or Jim Crow laws. They were often the victims of extreme cruelty and violence, sometimes resulting in deaths: by the post World War II era, African Americans became increasingly discontented with their long-standing inequality. In the words of Martin Luther King Jr., African Americans and their supporters challenged the nation to "rise up and live out the true meaning of its creed that all men are created equal..."

The civil rights movement marked an enormous change in American social, political, economic and civic life. It brought with it boycotts, sit-ins, nonviolent demonstrations and marches, court battles, bombings and other violence; prompted worldwide media coverage and intense public debate; forged enduring civic, economic and religious alliances; and disrupted and realigned the nation's two major political parties.

Over time, it has changed in fundamental ways the manner in which Blacks and Whites interact with and relate to one another. The movement resulted in the removal of codified, de jure racial segregation and discrimination from American life and law, and heavily influenced other groups and movements in struggles for civil rights and social equality within American society, including the Free Speech Movement, the disabled, the women's movement, and migrant workers. It also inspired the Native American rights movement, and in King's 1964 book Why We Can't Wait he wrote the U.S. "was born in genocide when it embraced the doctrine that the original American, the Indian, was an inferior race."

Media and coverage

Some activists and academics contend that American news media coverage of African American news, concerns, or dilemmas is inadequate, or that the news media present distorted images of African Americans.

To combat this, Robert L. Johnson founded Black Entertainment Television (BET), a network that targets young African Americans and urban audiences in the United States. Over the years, the network has aired such programming as rap and R&B music videos, urban-oriented movies and television series, and some public affairs programs. On Sunday mornings, BET would broadcast Christian programming; the network would also broadcast non-affiliated Christian programs during the early morning hours daily. According to Viacom, BET is now a global network that reaches households in the United States, Caribbean, Canada, and the United Kingdom. The network has gone on to spawn several spin-off channels, including BET Her (originally launched as BET on Jazz), which originally showcased jazz music-related programming, and later expanded to include general-interest urban programs as well as some R&B, soul, and world music.

Another network targeting African Americans is TV One. TV One's original programming was formally focused on lifestyle and entertainment-oriented shows, movies, fashion, and music programming. The network also reruns classic series from as far back as the 1970s to current series such as Empire and Sister Circle. TV One is owned by Urban One, founded and controlled by Catherine Hughes. Urban One is one of the nation's largest radio broadcasting companies and the largest African American-owned radio broadcasting company in the United States.

In June 2009, NBC News launched a new website named The Grio in partnership with the production team that created the Black documentary film Meeting David Wilson. It is the first African American video news site that focuses on underrepresented stories in existing national news. The Grio consists of a broad spectrum of original video packages, news articles, and contributor blogs on topics including breaking news, politics, health, business, entertainment and Black History.

Other Black-owned and oriented media outlets include:
 The Africa Channel – Dedicated to programming representing the best in African culture.
 aspireTV – a digital cable and satellite channel owned by businessman and former basketball player Magic Johnson.
 ATTV – an independent public affairs and educational channel.
 Bounce TV – a digital multicast network owned by E. W. Scripps Company.
 Cleo TV – a sister network to TV One targeting African American women.
 Fox Soul – a digital streaming channel primarily airing original talk shows and syndicated programming
 Oprah Winfrey Network – a cable and satellite network founded by Oprah Winfrey and jointly owned by Discovery, Inc. and Harpo Studios. While not exclusively targeting African Americans, much of its original programming is geared towards a similar demographic.
 Revolt – a music channel owned by Sean "Puff Daddy" Combs.
 Soul of the South Network – a regional broadcast network.
 VH1 – A female-oriented general entertainment channel owned by Viacom. Originally focused on light genres of music, the network's programming became slanted towards African American culture in recent years.

Culture

From their earliest presence in North America, African Americans have significantly contributed literature, art, agricultural skills, cuisine, clothing styles, music, language, and social and technological innovation to American culture. The cultivation and use of many agricultural products in the United States, such as yams, peanuts, rice, okra, sorghum, grits, watermelon, indigo dyes, and cotton, can be traced to West African and African American influences. Notable examples include George Washington Carver, who created nearly 500 products from peanuts, sweet potatoes, and pecans. Soul food is a variety of cuisine popular among African Americans. It is closely related to the cuisine of the Southern United States. The descriptive terminology may have originated in the mid-1960s, when soul was a common definer used to describe African American culture (for example, soul music). African Americans were the first peoples in the United States to make fried chicken, along with Scottish immigrants to the South. Although the Scottish had been frying chicken before they emigrated, they lacked the spices and flavor that African Americans had used when preparing the meal. The Scottish American settlers therefore adopted the African American method of seasoning chicken. However, fried chicken was generally a rare meal in the African American community, and was usually reserved for special events or celebrations.

Language

African American English is a variety (dialect, ethnolect, and sociolect) of American English, commonly spoken by urban working-class and largely bi-dialectal middle-class African Americans.

African American English evolved during the antebellum period through interaction between speakers of 16th- and 17th-century English of Great Britain and Ireland and various West African languages. As a result, the variety shares parts of its grammar and phonology with the Southern American English dialect. African American English differs from Standard American English (SAE) in certain pronunciation characteristics, tense usage, and grammatical structures, which were derived from West African languages (particularly those belonging to the Niger–Congo family).

Virtually all habitual speakers of African American English can understand and communicate in Standard American English. As with all linguistic forms, AAVE's usage is influenced by various factors, including geographical, educational and socioeconomic background, as well as formality of setting. Additionally, there are many literary uses of this variety of English, particularly in African American literature.

Traditional names

African American names are part of the cultural traditions of African Americans. Prior to the 1950s, and 1960s, most African American names closely resembled those used within European American culture. Babies of that era were generally given a few common names, with children using nicknames to distinguish the various people with the same name. With the rise of 1960s civil rights movement, there was a dramatic increase in names of various origins.

By the 1970s, and 1980s, it had become common among African Americans to invent new names for themselves, although many of these invented names took elements from popular existing names. Prefixes such as La/Le, Da/De, Ra/Re and Ja/Je, and suffixes like -ique/iqua, -isha and -aun/-awn are common, as are inventive spellings for common names. The book Baby Names Now: From Classic to Cool—The Very Last Word on First Names places the origins of "La" names in African American culture in New Orleans.

Even with the rise of inventive names, it is still common for African Americans to use biblical, historical, or traditional European names. Daniel, Christopher, Michael, David, James, Joseph, and Matthew were thus among the most frequent names for African American boys in 2013.

The name LaKeisha is typically considered American in origin, but has elements that were drawn from both French and West/Central African roots. Names such as LaTanisha, JaMarcus, DeAndre, and Shaniqua were created in the same way. Punctuation marks are seen more often within African American names than other American names, such as the names Mo'nique and D'Andre.

Religion

The majority of African Americans are Protestant, many of whom follow the historically Black churches. The term Black church refers to churches which minister to predominantly African American congregations. Black congregations were first established by freed slaves at the end of the 17th century, and later when slavery was abolished more African Americans were allowed to create a unique form of Christianity that was culturally influenced by African spiritual traditions.

According to a 2007 survey, more than half of the African American population are part of the historically Black churches. The largest Protestant denomination among African Americans are the Baptists, distributed mainly in four denominations, the largest being the National Baptist Convention, USA and the National Baptist Convention of America. The second largest are the Methodists, the largest denominations are the African Methodist Episcopal Church and the African Methodist Episcopal Zion Church.

Pentecostals are distributed among several different religious bodies, with the Church of God in Christ as the largest among them by far. About 16% of African American Christians are members of White Protestant communions, these denominations (which include the United Church of Christ) mostly have a 2 to 3% African American membership. There are also large numbers of Catholics, constituting 5% of the African American population. Of the total number of Jehovah's Witnesses, 22% are Black.

Some African Americans follow Islam. Historically, between 15 and 30% of enslaved Africans brought to the Americas were Muslims, but most of these Africans were converted to Christianity during the era of American slavery. During the twentieth century, some African Americans converted to Islam, mainly through the influence of Black nationalist groups that preached with distinctive Islamic practices; including the Moorish Science Temple of America, and the largest organization, the Nation of Islam, founded in the 1930s, which attracted at least 20,000 people by 1963. Prominent members included activist Malcolm X and boxer Muhammad Ali.

Malcolm X is considered the first person to start the movement among African Americans towards mainstream Islam, after he left the Nation and made the pilgrimage to Mecca. In 1975, Warith Deen Mohammed, the son of Elijah Muhammad took control of the Nation after his father's death and guided the majority of its members to orthodox Islam.

African American Muslims constitute 20% of the total U.S. Muslim population, the majority are Sunni or orthodox Muslims, some of these identify under the community of W. Deen Mohammed. The Nation of Islam led by Louis Farrakhan has a membership ranging from 20,000 to 50,000 members.

There is also a small group of African American Jews, making up less than 0.5% of African Americans or about 2% of the Jewish population in the United States. Most of these Jews are part of mainstream groups such as the Reform, Conservative, or Orthodox branches of Judaism; although there are significant numbers of people who are part of non-mainstream syncretic Jewish groups, largely the Black Hebrew Israelites, whose beliefs include the claim that African Americans are descended from the Biblical Israelites. Jews of any race typically do not accept Black Hebrew Israelites as Jews, in part because they are usually not Jewish according to Jewish law, and in part because these groups are sometimes associated with antisemitism.

Confirmed atheists are less than one half of one-percent, similar to numbers for Hispanics.

Music

African American music is one of the most pervasive African American cultural influences in the United States today and is among the most dominant in mainstream popular music. Hip hop, R&B, funk, rock and roll, soul, blues, and other contemporary American musical forms originated in Black communities and evolved from other Black forms of music, including blues, doo-wop, barbershop, ragtime, bluegrass, jazz, and gospel music.

African American-derived musical forms have also influenced and been incorporated into virtually every other popular music genre in the world, including country and techno. African American genres are the most important ethnic vernacular tradition in America, as they have developed independent of African traditions from which they arise more so than any other immigrant groups, including Europeans; make up the broadest and longest lasting range of styles in America; and have, historically, been more influential, interculturally, geographically, and economically, than other American vernacular traditions.

Dance
African Americans have also had an important role in American dance. Bill T. Jones, a prominent modern choreographer and dancer, has included historical African American themes in his work, particularly in the piece "Last Supper at Uncle Tom's Cabin/The Promised Land". Likewise, Alvin Ailey's artistic work, including his "Revelations" based on his experience growing up as an African American in the South during the 1930s, has had a significant influence on modern dance. Another form of dance, Stepping, is an African American tradition whose performance and competition has been formalized through the traditionally Black fraternities and sororities at universities.

Literature and academics
Many African American authors have written stories, poems, and essays influenced by their experiences as African Americans. African American literature is a major genre in American literature. Famous examples include Langston Hughes, James Baldwin, Richard Wright, Zora Neale Hurston, Ralph Ellison, Nobel Prize winner Toni Morrison, and Maya Angelou.

African American inventors have created many widely used devices in the world and have contributed to international innovation. Norbert Rillieux created the technique for converting sugar cane juice into white sugar crystals. Moreover, Rillieux left Louisiana in 1854 and went to France, where he spent ten years working with the Champollions deciphering Egyptian hieroglyphics from the Rosetta Stone. Most slave inventors were nameless, such as the slave owned by the Confederate President Jefferson Davis who designed the ship propeller used by the Confederate navy.

By 1913, over 1,000 inventions were patented by Black Americans. Among the most notable inventors were Jan Matzeliger, who developed the first machine to mass-produce shoes, and Elijah McCoy, who invented automatic lubrication devices for steam engines. Granville Woods had 35 patents to improve electric railway systems, including the first system to allow moving trains to communicate. Garrett A. Morgan developed the first automatic traffic signal and gas mask.

Lewis Howard Latimer invented an improvement for the incandescent light bulb. More recent inventors include Frederick McKinley Jones, who invented the movable refrigeration unit for food transport in trucks and trains. Lloyd Quarterman worked with six other Black scientists on the creation of the atomic bomb (code named the Manhattan Project.) Quarterman also helped develop the first nuclear reactor, which was used in the atomically powered submarine called the Nautilus.

A few other notable examples include the first successful open heart surgery, performed by Dr. Daniel Hale Williams, and the air conditioner, patented by Frederick McKinley Jones. Dr. Mark Dean holds three of the original nine patents on the computer on which all PCs are based. More current contributors include Otis Boykin, whose inventions included several novel methods for manufacturing electrical components that found use in applications such as guided missile systems and computers, and Colonel Frederick Gregory, who was not only the first Black astronaut pilot but the person who redesigned the cockpits for the last three space shuttles. Gregory was also on the team that pioneered the microwave instrumentation landing system.

Terminology

General

The term African American, popularized by Jesse Jackson in the 1980s, carries important social implications. Earlier terms used to describe Americans of African ancestry referred more to skin color than to ancestry. Other terms (such as colored, person of color, or negro) were included in the wording of various laws and legal decisions which some thought were being used as tools of White supremacy and oppression.

A 16-page pamphlet entitled "A Sermon on the Capture of Lord Cornwallis" is notable for the attribution of its authorship to "An African American". Published in 1782, the book's use of this phrase predates any other yet identified by more than 50 years.

In the 1980s, the term African American was advanced on the model of, for example, German American or Irish American, to give descendants of American slaves, and other American Blacks who lived through the slavery era, a heritage and a cultural base. The term was popularized in Black communities around the country via word of mouth and ultimately received mainstream use after Jesse Jackson publicly used the term in front of a national audience in 1988. Subsequently, major media outlets adopted its use.

Surveys show that the majority of Black Americans have no preference for African American versus Black American, although they have a slight preference for the latter in personal settings and the former in more formal settings. Many African Americans have expressed a preference for the term African American because it was formed in the same way as the terms for the many other ethnic groups currently living in the United States. Some argued further that, because of the historical circumstances surrounding the capture, enslavement, and systematic attempts to de-Africanize Blacks in the United States under chattel slavery, most African Americans are unable to trace their ancestry to any specific African nation; hence, the entire continent serves as a geographic marker.

The term African American embraces pan-Africanism as earlier enunciated by prominent African thinkers such as Marcus Garvey, W. E. B. Du Bois, and George Padmore. The term Afro-Usonian, and variations of such, are more rarely used.

Official identity

Since 1977, in an attempt to keep up with changing social opinion, the United States government has officially classified Black people (revised to Black or African American in 1997) as "having origins in any of the black racial groups of Africa." Other federal offices, such as the U.S. Census Bureau, adhere to the Office of Management and Budget standards on race in their data collection and tabulation efforts. In preparation for the 2010 U.S. Census, a marketing and outreach plan called 2010 Census Integrated Communications Campaign Plan (ICC) recognized and defined African Americans as Black people born in the United States. From the ICC perspective, African Americans are one of three groups of Black people in the United States.

The ICC plan was to reach the three groups by acknowledging that each group has its own sense of community that is based on geography and ethnicity. The best way to market the census process toward any of the three groups is to reach them through their own unique communication channels and not treat the entire Black population of the U.S. as though they are all African Americans with a single ethnic and geographical background. The Federal Bureau of Investigation of the U.S. Department of Justice categorizes Black or African American people as "[a] person having origins in any of the black racial groups of Africa" through racial categories used in the UCR Program adopted from the Statistical Policy Handbook (1978) and published by the Office of Federal Statistical Policy and Standards, U.S. Department of Commerce, derived from the 1977 Office of Management and Budget classification.

Admixture

Historically, "race mixing" between Black and White people was taboo in the United States. So-called anti-miscegenation laws, barring Blacks and Whites from marrying or having sex, were established in colonial America as early as 1691, and endured in many Southern states until the Supreme Court ruled them unconstitutional in Loving v. Virginia (1967). The taboo among American Whites surrounding White-Black relations is a historical consequence of the oppression and racial segregation of African Americans. Historian David Brion Davis notes the racial mixing that occurred during slavery was frequently attributed by the planter class to the "lower-class White males" but Davis concludes that "there is abundant evidence that many slaveowners, sons of slaveowners, and overseers took black mistresses or in effect raped the wives and daughters of slave families." A famous example was Thomas Jefferson's mistress, Sally Hemings. Although publicly opposed to race mixing, Jefferson, in his Notes on the State of Virginia published in 1785, wrote: "The improvement of the blacks in body and mind, in the first instance of their mixture with the whites, has been observed by every one, and proves that their inferiority is not the effect merely of their condition of life".

Harvard University historian Henry Louis Gates Jr. wrote in 2009 that "African Americans...are a racially mixed or mulatto people—deeply and overwhelmingly so" (see genetics). After the Emancipation Proclamation, Chinese American men married African American women in high proportions to their total marriage numbers due to few Chinese American women being in the United States. African slaves and their descendants have also had a history of cultural exchange and intermarriage with Native Americans, although they did not necessarily retain social, cultural or linguistic ties to Native peoples. There are also increasing intermarriages and offspring between non-Hispanic Blacks and Hispanics of any race, especially between Puerto Ricans and African Americans (American-born Blacks). According to author M.M. Drymon, many African Americans identify as having Scots-Irish ancestry.

Racially mixed marriages have become increasingly accepted in the United States since the civil rights movement and up to the present day. Approval in national opinion polls has risen from 36% in 1978, to 48% in 1991, 65% in 2002, 77% in 2007. A Gallup poll conducted in 2013 found that 84% of Whites and 96% of Blacks approved of interracial marriage, and 87% overall.

At the end of World War II, some African American military men who had been stationed in Japan married Japanese women, who then immigrated to the United States.

Terminology dispute
In her book The End of Blackness, as well as in an essay for Salon, author Debra Dickerson has argued that the term Black should refer strictly to the descendants of Africans who were brought to America as slaves, and not to the sons and daughters of Black immigrants who lack that ancestry. Thus, under her definition, President Barack Obama, who is the son of a Kenyan, is not Black. She makes the argument that grouping all people of African descent together regardless of their unique ancestral circumstances would inevitably deny the lingering effects of slavery within the American community of slave descendants, in addition to denying Black immigrants recognition of their own unique ancestral backgrounds. "Lumping us all together," Dickerson wrote, "erases the significance of slavery and continuing racism while giving the appearance of progress."

Similar viewpoints have been expressed by author Stanley Crouch in a New York Daily News piece, Charles Steele Jr. of the Southern Christian Leadership Conference and African American columnist David Ehrenstein of the Los Angeles Times, who accused White liberals of flocking to Blacks who were Magic Negros, a term that refers to a Black person with no past who simply appears to assist the mainstream White (as cultural protagonists/drivers) agenda. Ehrenstein went on to say "He's there to assuage white 'guilt' they feel over the role of slavery and racial segregation in American history."

The American Descendants of Slavery (ADOS) movement coalesces around this view, arguing that Black descendants of American slavery deserve a separate ethnic category that distinguishes them from other Black groups in the United States. Their terminology has gained popularity in some circles, but others have criticized the movement for a perceived bias against (especially poor and Black) immigrants, and for its often inflammatory rhetoric. Politicians such as Obama and Harris have received especially pointed criticism from the movement, as neither are ADOS and have spoken out at times against policies specific to them.

Many Pan-African movements and organizations that are ideologically Black nationalist, anti-imperialist, anti-Zionist, and Scientific socialist like The All-African People's Revolutionary Party (A-APRP), have argued that African (relating to the diaspora) and/or New Afrikan should be used instead of African American. Most notably, Malcolm X and Kwame Ture expressed similar views that African Americans are Africans who "happen to be in America", and should not claim or identify as being American if they are fighting for Black (New Afrikan) liberation. Historically, this is due to the enslavement of Africans during the Trans-Atlantic slave trade, ongoing anti-black violence, and structural racism in countries like the United States.

Terms no longer in common use
Before the independence of the Thirteen Colonies until the abolition of slavery in 1865, an African American slave was commonly known as a negro. Free negro was the legal status in the territory of an African American person who was not enslaved. In response to the project of the American Colonization Society to transport free Blacks to the future Liberia, a project most Blacks strongly rejected, the Blacks at the time said they were no more African than White Americans were European, and referred to themselves with what they considered a more acceptable term, "colored Americans". The term was used until the second quarter of the 20th century, when it was considered outmoded and generally gave way again to the exclusive use of negro. By the 1940s, the term was commonly capitalized (Negro); but by the mid-1960s, it was considered disparaging. By the end of the 20th century, negro had come to be considered inappropriate and was rarely used and perceived as a pejorative. The term is rarely used by younger Black people, but remained in use by many older African Americans who had grown up with the term, particularly in the southern U.S. The term remains in use in some contexts, such as the United Negro College Fund, an American philanthropic organization that funds scholarships for Black students and general scholarship funds for 39 private historically Black colleges and universities.

There are many other deliberately insulting terms, many of which were in common use (e.g., nigger), but had become unacceptable in normal discourse before the end of the 20th century. One exception is the use, among the Black community, of the slur nigger rendered as nigga, representing the pronunciation of the word in African American English. This usage has been popularized by American rap and hip-hop music cultures and is used as part of an in-group lexicon and speech. It is not necessarily derogatory and, when used among Black people, the word is often used to mean "homie" or "friend".

Acceptance of intra-group usage of the word nigga is still debated, although it has established a foothold among younger generations. The NAACP denounces the use of both nigga and nigger. Mixed-race usage of nigga is still considered taboo, particularly if the speaker is White. However, trends indicate that usage of the term in intragroup settings is increasing even among White youth due to the popularity of rap and hip hop culture.

See also

 African-American art
 African American cinema
 African-American middle class
 African-American neighborhood
 African-American upper class
 African diaspora in the Americas
 Afrophobia
 AP African American Studies
 Black Belt in the American South
 Black Hispanic and Latino Americans
 Black Southerners
 Civil rights movement (1865–1896)
 Civil rights movement (1896–1954)
 Juneteenth
 National Museum of African American History and Culture
 North Africans in the United States
 Society and Black people in the Spanish Colonial Americas
 South African Americans
 Stereotypes of African Americans
 Timeline of the civil rights movement
 West Indian Americans

Diaspora

 African Americans in Africa
 African Americans in Ghana
 Americo-Liberian people
 Sierra Leone Creole people
 African Americans in France
 African Americans in Israel
 Black Nova Scotians
 Samaná Americans

Lists

 Index of articles related to African Americans
 List of African-American neighborhoods
 List of African-American newspapers and media outlets
 List of historically black colleges and universities
 List of African-American inventors and scientists
 List of monuments to African Americans
 List of populated places in the United States with African-American plurality populations
 List of topics related to the African diaspora
 Lists of African Americans

Notes

References

Further reading

 
 Finkelman, Paul, ed. Encyclopedia of African American History, 1619-1895: From the Colonial Period to the Age of Frederick Douglass (3 vol Oxford University Press, 2006).
 Finkelman, Paul, ed. Encyclopedia of African American History, 1896 to the Present: From the Age of Segregation to the Twenty-first Century (5 vol. Oxford University Press, USA, 2009).
 John Hope Franklin, Alfred Moss, From Slavery to Freedom. A History of African Americans, McGraw-Hill Education 2001, standard work, first edition in 1947.
 Gates, Henry L. and Evelyn Brooks Higginbotham (eds), African American Lives, Oxford University Press, 2004 – more than 600 biographies.
 Darlene Clark Hine, Rosalyn Terborg-Penn, Elsa Barkley Brown (eds), Black Women in America: An Historical Encyclopedia, Paperback Edition, Indiana University Press 2005.
 
 Kranz, Rachel. African-American Business Leaders and Entrepreneurs (Infobase Publishing, 2004).
 Salzman, Jack, ed. Encyclopedia of Afro-American culture and history, New York City: Macmillan Library Reference USA, 1996.

External links

 Richard Thompson Ford Name Games, Slate, September 16, 2004. Article discussing the problems of defining African American
 "Of Arms & the Law: Don Kates on Afro-American Homicide Rates"
 Scientific American Magazine (June 2006) Trace Elements Reconnecting African Americans to an ancestral past
 "The Definition of Political Absurdity", San Francisco Chronicle, March 2, 2007
 Black History related original documents and photos
 Frank Newport, "Black or African American?" , Gallup, September 28, 2007
 "The Long Journey of Black Americans" – slideshow by The First Post

 
Ethnic groups in the United States
History of civil rights in the United States
American